Basil Wells is a former Rhodesian international lawn bowler.

He won a bronze medal in the fours with Alex Pascoe, Charles Bradley and Ronnie Turner at the 1958 Commonwealth Games.

References

Possibly living people
Year of birth missing
Zimbabwean male bowls players
Bowls players at the 1958 British Empire and Commonwealth Games
Commonwealth Games bronze medallists for Southern Rhodesia
Commonwealth Games medallists in lawn bowls
Medallists at the 1958 British Empire and Commonwealth Games